Suam, Uganda is a border crossing between Uganda and Kenya. The settlement sits directly across the Suam River from Suam, Kenya.

Location
The coordinates of Suam, Uganda are 1°13'02.0"N 34°43'56.0"E (Latitude:1.217214; Longitude:34.732223).

Points of interest
Suam, Uganda marks the eastern end of the Kapchorwa–Suam Road in Uganda. Across the Suam Bridge in Suam, Kenya, the Suam–Endebess–Kitale–Eldoret Road begins its  journey southeastwards to Eldoret. The governments of Kenya and Uganda are working jointly to tarmac both roads to grade II bitumen surface and improve trade between the two countries in this transport corridor. Both countries are working to establish a one-stop-border-post (OSBP) at Suam, similar to the stops established at Malaba and Busia.

See also
 Mount Elgon
 Mount Elgon National Park

References

External links
 Multinational: Uganda/Kenya: Kapchorwa-Suam-Endebess-Kitale-Eldoret Bypass Roads Project - Environmental And Social Impact Assessment (ESIA) Summary

Populated places in Eastern Region, Uganda
Bukwo District
Kenya–Uganda border crossings